The Treaty of Saginaw, also known as the Treaty with the Chippewa, was made between Gen. Lewis Cass and Chief Mash Kee Yosh, Chief John Okemos, Chief Wasso and other Native American tribes of the Great Lakes region (principally the Ojibwe, but also the Ottawa and Potawatomi) in what is now the United States, on September 24, 1819, proclaimed by the President of the United States on March 25, 1820, and placed in law as .

Native Americans ceded a large tract of land (more than six million acres (24,000 km²) in the central portion of the Lower Peninsula of Michigan. The southern boundary of the tract extended from a few miles northeast of Jackson west to just northeast of Kalamazoo. The line then ran directly to the head of the Thunder Bay River in south-central Montmorency County and then along the river to the mouth in Thunder Bay, near Alpena. From there it extended northeast to the international boundary line between the United States and the British Province of Upper Canada and then along the boundary south to the boundary line established by the Treaty of Detroit in 1807, which ran from the shore of Lake Huron in northeast Sanilac County southwest to a point several miles northeast of Lansing and then due south the point of origin. The treaty reserved several smaller tracts of land for Indian use within the ceded territory.

See also
List of treaties

References

External links
The 1819 Saginaw Cession and Treaty

1819 treaties
Anishinaabe treaty areas
Native American history of Michigan
Saginaw
Legal history of Michigan
Military history of Michigan
Pre-statehood history of Michigan